Videocracy is a 2009 documentary film directed by Swedish-Italian Erik Gandini about Italian television and its impact on Italian culture and politics, and about Silvio Berlusconi's powerful position on all of these. Gandini coined the phrase "The Evilness of Banality" to describe the cultural phenomenon of Berlusconism, thus making a word play on Hannah Arendt's "Banality of Evil".

Soon after its theatrical premiere in Sweden, the film was shown at the 66th Venice International Film Festival where it gained massive attention. The trailer for the film has been banned by most Italian television broadcasters.

Videocracy uses the theme song for Silvio Berlusconi's presidential campaign, and now party theme, Meno male che Silvio c'è! (loosely translated: Thank God for Silvio!). When first hearing it the film's director Erik Gandini thought it was satire.

Videocracy has won awards at the Toronto International Film Festival, Sheffield Doc/Fest, the Golden Graal awards, and the Tempo Documentary Award of 2010. Videocracy was widely distributed internationally, seeing theatrical release in  the United States, UK, the Netherlands, France, Poland, and Sweden among other countries. In Italy, where it opened in 90 theaters across the country on the weekend of 4 September 2009, Videocracy came in 4th in box office rankings.

Plot

The Italian veline phenomenon is explained. We meet young mechanic Ricky who tries to become a TV star, but complains that it is more difficult for a man. TV agent Lele Mora admiringly says that Berlusconi resembles Benito Mussolini. Paparazzo Fabrizio Corona takes embarrassing photographs of celebrities, and asks them for money to not publicize them. He explains that he is a new version of Robin Hood: he steals from the rich, but keeps the money to himself. When he was convicted for extortion, it made him a greater celebrity, and he is now cashing in on this. He is shown full-frontally naked taking a shower.

References

External links 
 
 
 
 Videocracy, a review by the Wu Ming collective.
 http://filmmakermagazine.com/directorinterviews/2010/02/erik-gandini-videocracy.html
 http://www.guardian.co.uk/film/2010/jun/23/videocracy-review
 http://movies.nytimes.com/2010/02/12/movies/12videocracy.html?em
 http://newyork.timeout.com/articles/film/82822/videocracy-film-review

2009 films
Danish documentary films
Finnish documentary films
British documentary films
2000s Italian-language films
Swedish documentary films
2009 documentary films
Works about Silvio Berlusconi
Documentary films about the media
Films directed by Erik Gandini
2000s British films
2000s Swedish films